An iridectomy, also known as a surgical iridectomy or corectomy, is the surgical removal of part of the iris. These procedures are most frequently performed in the treatment of closed-angle glaucoma and iris melanoma.

Comparison with Nd:YAG laser iridotomy

In acute angle-closure glaucoma cases, surgical iridectomy has been superseded by Nd:YAG laser iridotomy, because the laser procedure is much safer. Opening the globe for a surgical iridectomy in a patient with high intraocular pressure greatly increases the risk of suprachoroidal hemorrhage, with potential for associated expulsive hemorrhage. Nd:YAG laser iridotomy avoids such a catastrophe by using a laser to create a hole in the iris, which facilitates flow of aqueous humor from the posterior to the anterior chamber of the eye.

Current indications
Surgical iridectomy is commonly indicated and performed in the following cases:
 Cataract surgery in a glaucoma patient
 Combined procedure for cataract and glaucoma
 Acute closed-angle glaucoma
 Posterior capsular tears with vitreous loss
 Implantation of anterior chamber IOL.
 Vitreoretinal procedure involving injection of silicone oil. The location of the iridectomy in such cases is at 6 o'clock, as opposed to routine iridectomy done at 11 to 1 o'clock. This is because silicone oil is less dense than water.
 Iris trauma

Types
 An antiphogistic iridectomy is the surgical removal of part of the iris to reduce intraocular pressure in inflammatory conditions of the eye.
 A basal iridectomy is an iridectomy which includes the root of the iris.
 An optical iridectomy is the surgical removal of part of the iris to enlarge the existing pupil, or to form an artificial pupil, when the natural pupil is ineffectual.
 A peripheral iridectomy is the surgical removal of a portion of the iris in the region of its root, leaving the pupillary margin and sphincter pupillae muscle intact. It is used in the treatment of glaucoma.
 A preliminary iridectomy, or preparatory iridectomy, is the surgical removal of part of the iris preceding cataract extraction. It facilitates the removal of the cataractous lens.
 A sector iridectomy, also known as a complete iridectomy or total iridectomy, is the surgical removal of a complete radial section of the iris extending from the pupillary margin to the root of the iris. A key-hole pupil is left by the removal of a wedge-shaped section of iris.
 A stenopeic iridectomy is the surgical removal of a narrow slit or a minute portion of the iris, leaving the sphincter pupillae muscle intact.
 A therapeutic iridectomy is the surgical removal of a portion of the iris for the cure or prevention of an ocular disease.

See also
 Eye surgery
 Glaucoma surgery
 List of surgeries by type

References

Eye surgery